Valle de la Luna is Spanish for Valley of the Moon and it may refer to:

Valle de la Luna (Argentina)
Valle de la Luna (Bolivia) in the La Paz Department, Bolivia
Valle de la Luna, Potosí, Bolivia (also called "El Sillar")  in the Potosí Department, Bolivia
Valle de la Luna (Chile)

See also
Valley of the Moon (disambiguation)